George Ernest Ratsey (25 July 1875 – 25 December 1942) was a British sailor who competed in the 1908 Summer Olympics. He is the father of Colin and Ernest Ratsey.

Biography
He was a crew member of the British boat Sorais, which won the bronze medal in the 8 metre class. He died on 25 December 1942 in New Rochelle, New York.

References

1875 births
1942 deaths
British male sailors (sport)
Sailors at the 1908 Summer Olympics – 8 Metre
Olympic sailors of Great Britain
Olympic bronze medallists for Great Britain
Olympic medalists in sailing
Sportspeople from New Rochelle, New York
Medalists at the 1908 Summer Olympics